Supatra Yompakdee (born 22 May 1962) is a Thai judoka. She competed in the women's heavyweight event at the 1992 Summer Olympics.

References

1962 births
Living people
Supatra Yompakdee
Supatra Yompakdee
Judoka at the 1992 Summer Olympics
Place of birth missing (living people)
Supatra Yompakdee